Sir James Clarke Lawrence, 1st Baronet (1820 - 21 May 1897) was Lord Mayor of London and a Liberal politician who sat in the House of Commons from 1868 to 1885.

Lawrence was the son of William Lawrence, an alderman of the City of London, and his wife Jane Clarke, daughter of James Clarke. Lawrence was  an alderman and Deputy Lieutenant for the City of London and a J.P. for Middlesex, Surrey and the city of Westminster. From 1862 to 1863 he was Sheriff of London and Middlesex. He was also president of the Bridewell and Bethlehem Hospitals.

Lawrence was elected Member of Parliament for Lambeth at a by-election in 1865, but lost the seat again at the following 1865 general election. In 1868 he became  Lord Mayor of London, shortly before he was re-elected for Lambeth at the 1868 general election. He was created a baronet in November 1869 on the opening of Holborn Viaduct and Blackfriars Bridge.  Lawrence held the seat at Lambeth until 1885.

In 1886, Lawrence contested the Welsh constituency of West Carmarthenshire as a Liberal Unionist, but was heavily defeated by the sitting Liberal member, W.R.H. Powell.

He and his brother Edwin were of material assistance to the Unitarians, donating a site in Kensington worth £5000, on which a church was built in 1887. The inaugural congregation, started by Theophilus Lindsey in 1774, moved to that location, thus freeing up Essex Street Chapel to be turned into offices and used for the general good of the denomination, as specified by the brothers.

Lawrence was married to Agnes Harriette Castle and had one child Theodora. He died at the age of 76. One of his brothers, William Lawrence, was MP for the City of London. Another, Edwin Durning-Lawrence, was M.P. for Truro. His nephew was Frederick Pethick-Lawrence, a pacifist and pro-women's-suffrage MP.

He is buried in the Lawrence family vault in Kensal Green Cemetery.

References

External links

|-

1820 births
1897 deaths
Burials at Kensal Green Cemetery
Liberal Party (UK) MPs for English constituencies
UK MPs 1859–1865
UK MPs 1868–1874
UK MPs 1874–1880
UK MPs 1880–1885
Deputy Lieutenants of the City of London
Sheriffs of the City of London
19th-century lord mayors of London
19th-century English politicians
Baronets in the Baronetage of the United Kingdom
Liberal Unionist Party parliamentary candidates